Dexter is a city in Stoddard County, Missouri, United States, founded in 1873. The population was 7,864 at the 2010 census.

History

Dexter was platted in 1873. Mr. Dex, an early settler, gave the community the name of his horse, Dexter.  Dexter experienced rapid growth with the arrival of the St. Louis, Iron Mountain and Southern Railway. A post office called Dexter City was established in 1873, and the name was changed to Dexter in 1887.

The Dexter Gymnasium was listed on the National Register of Historic Places in 2001.

On July 10, 2021, an EF2 tornado hit the town with at least 150 homes reported damaged.

Geography

Dexter is located on what is known as Crowley's Ridge. It is at the intersection of U.S. Route 60 and Missouri Route 25.

Demographics

2010 census
As of the census of 2010, there were 7,865 people, 3,359 households, and 2,108 families living in the city. The racial makeup of the city was 97.1% White, 0.5% African American, 0.5% Native American, 0.2% Asian, 0.2% from other races, and 1.4% from two or more races. Hispanic or Latino of any race were 1.9% of the population.

There were 3,359 households, of which 30.8% had children under the age of 18 living with them, 43.8% were married couples living together, 14.3% had a female householder with no husband present, 4.6% had a male householder with no wife present, and 37.2% were non-families. 32.5% of all households were made up of individuals, and 14.4% had someone living alone who was 65 years of age or older. The average household size was 2.28 and the average family size was 2.83.

The median age in the city was 40.5 years. 22.9% of residents were under the age of 18; 8.3% were between the ages of 18 and 24; 24.4% were from 25 to 44; 24.8% were from 45 to 64; and 19.8% were 65 years of age or older. The gender makeup of the city was 45.6% male and 54.4% female.

2000 census
As of the census of 2000, there were 7,356 people, 3,237 households, and 2,019 families living in the city. The population density was 1,208.0 people per square mile (466.4/km2). There were 3,560 housing units at an average density of 584.6 per square mile (225.7/km2). The racial makeup of the city was 97.31% White, 0.15% African American, 0.46% Native American, 0.18% Asian, 0.50% from other races, and 1.40% from two or more races. Hispanic or Latino of any race were 1.20% of the population.

There were 3,237 households, out of which 29.4% had children under the age of 18 living with them, 47.0% were married couples living together, 12.1% had a female householder with no husband present, and 37.6% were non-families. 33.8% of all households were made up of individuals, and 17.7% had someone living alone who was 65 years of age or older. The average household size was 2.23 and the average family size was 2.83.

In the city the population was spread out, with 23.7% under the age of 18, 9.2% from 18 to 24, 25.9% from 25 to 44, 20.9% from 45 to 64, and 20.3% who were 65 years of age or older. The median age was 39 years. For every 100 females there were 82.2 males. For every 100 females age 18 and over, there were 77.3 males.

The median income for a household in the city was $23,116, and the median income for a family was $32,175. Males had a median income of $26,724 versus $17,409 for females. The per capita income for the city was $15,034. About 14.8% of families and 18.3% of the population were below the poverty line, including 23.5% of those under age 18 and 16.3% of those age 65 or over.

Climate
Dexter has a humid subtropical climate (Köppen climate classification Cfa).

Education
Dexter R-XI School District operated two elementary schools, one middle school and one high school.

The town has a lending library, the Keller Public Library Of Dexter.

Notable people
 George K. Sisler, Medal of Honor recipient
 Clyde A. Vaughn, United States Army Lieutenant General and Director of the Army National Guard
 James P. Walker, politician. member of the House of Representatives.
 Max West, baseball player, member of Pacific Coast League Hall of Fame
 Orville Zimmerman, United States Representative for Missouri's 10th congressional district, was principal of Dexter High School, 1904-1909
 A.B.Rutledge,  Author of MILES AWAY FROM YOU

See also

International Hat Company

References

External links
 Historic maps of Dexter in the Sanborn Maps of Missouri Collection at the University of Missouri

Cities in Stoddard County, Missouri
1873 establishments in Missouri
Cities in Missouri